David Goffin was the defending champion, but lost in the second round to Andy Murray.

Yoshihito Nishioka won his first ATP title, defeating Pierre-Hugues Herbert in the final, 7–5, 2–6, 6–4.

Seeds
The top four seeds receive a bye into the second round.

Draw

Finals

Top half

Bottom half

Qualifying

Seeds

Qualifiers

Qualifying draw

First qualifier

Second qualifier

Third qualifier

Fourth qualifier

References
 Main draw
 Qualifying draw

2018 ATP World Tour
2018 Singles
2018 in Chinese tennis